The 2019–20 season is Almagro's 5th consecutive season in the second division of Argentine football. In addition to Primera B Nacional, the club are competing in the Copa Argentina.

The season generally covers the period from 1 July 2019 to 30 June 2020.

Review

Pre-season
The departures of Lucas Piovi and Damián Arce were revealed on 14 and 15 June, with the wide midfielders joining Arsenal de Sarandí and Instituto respectively. On 19 June, Almagro announced the signing of forward Facundo Suárez from San Martín (F); who he had scored eight times for in the 2018–19 Torneo Federal A. Joaquín Susvielles followed Piovi and Arce out the door on 21 June, as he penned a contract with Platense. Gonzalo Jaque completed a move in from San Lorenzo on 26 June. Mariano Puch to Comunicaciones was confirmed on 27 June. José Méndez signed on 29 June, having spent a season in Mexico with Tampico Madero. Some loans from 2018 to 2019 ended on 30 June, but Brian Benítez, Ezequiel Denis and Santiago López extended their loan stints.

Adrián Torres left for Chacarita Juniors on 1 July. Almagro formalised five new signings on 2 July. Walter Rueda made a move from Atlético Paraná, while Román Martinangeli, Sebastián Diana, Lucas Bossio and Norberto Paparatto signed from Sacachispas, Crucero del Norte, Guillermo Brown and Mitre respectively. Leonardo Acosta joined fellow Primera B Nacional team Atlético de Rafaela on 3 July. Acquisition number nine came on 8 July, as goalkeeper Cristian Limousin returned to Argentina from Ecuador's Técnico Universitario; he previously played for Almagro from 2016 to 2018. Germán Herrera arrived from Boca Unidos on 10 July. Marcelo Scatolaro left for Comunicaciones on 12 July. Almagro went unbeaten in friendlies with Chacarita Juniors on 13 July.

Mauro González moved out to Temperley on 13 July, while Lucas Wilchez did the opposite on 16 July. Almagro held three friendlies on 16 July, two versus Colegiales and one against the Argentina U23s; they'd draw one and lose two. Maximiliano García agreed to go to Comunicaciones on 18 July. New player Facundo Suárez netted a goal in each game as Almagro drew and then beat Ferro Carril Oeste on 20 July. Gustavo Turraca returned to Primera B Nacional on loan on 23 July, having been relegated from it with Los Andes in 2018–19. On 24 July, Agustín Coscia was loaned from Rosario Central. A friendly with Quilmes was postponed on 26 July, in order to preserve the Estadio Centenario Ciudad de Quilmes pitch following heavy rain; rescheduling was confirmed.

Friendlies with Quilmes were belatedly played on 30 July, as they couldn't be separated after two goalless draws. On 3 August, Almagro travelled to face Nueva Chicago in back-to-back exhibitions; subsequently losing on both occasions. 9 August saw Fermín Holgado pen terms from Olimpo. On 10 August, Leandro Lugarzo departed for Guillermo Brown.

August
Almagro stunned Primera División club Boca Juniors on 13 August by eliminating them from the Copa Argentina R32, with Juan Manuel Martínez's goal taking the tie to penalties which saw Almagro came out victorious. Almagro signed Patricio Toranzo from Huracán on 15 August. Almagro's opening day fixture with San Martín (T) in Primera B Nacional was postponed, after the San Miguel de Tucumán club had flight problems due to an ongoing storm. Almagro eventually had their first fixture on 25 August, as a Leandro Aguirre penalty consigned them to defeat. They lost to Argentinos Juniors in an exhibition encounter on 27 August.

September
Germán Herrera scored for Almagro as they drew away to Villa Dálmine on 1 September. Two days later, Almagro lost to Lanús in a mid-season friendly match.

Squad

Transfers
Domestic transfer windows:3 July 2019 to 24 September 201920 January 2020 to 19 February 2020.

Transfers in

Transfers out

Loans in

Friendlies

Pre-season
Chacarita Juniors revealed a pre-season friendly (set for 13 July) with Almagro on 20 June 2019; with it taking place on the premises of UTA Argentina in Moreno. The club confirmed a series of friendlies of 3 July, including trips to Quilmes and Nueva Chicago. They also had matches with Colegiales and the Argentina U23s.

Mid-season
Almagro would meet Argentinos Juniors in a friendly at the Estadio Diego Armando Maradona on 27 August. They'd face another Primera División team in Lanús; away, on 3 September.

Competitions

Primera B Nacional

Results summary

Matches
The fixtures for the 2019–20 league season were announced on 1 August 2019, with a new format of split zones being introduced. Almagro were drawn in Zone B.

Copa Argentina

Almagro were drawn against Boca Juniors in the round of thirty-two in the Copa Argentina.

Squad statistics

Appearances and goals

Statistics accurate as of 3 September 2019.

Goalscorers

Notes

References

Club Almagro seasons
Almagro